Dessaline Harris (1 October 1895 - 29 March 1966) was a Liberian jurist and a member of the Supreme Court of Liberia.

Born at Buchanan in Grand Bassa County, he studied at Cuttington College and began his public career as a Justice of the Peace in 1916. From 1940 to 1947, he was the Grand Bassa County attorney; he left this position to become the judge of the county's circuit court, which office he held until 6 January 1954. On the latter date, he was appointed to the Supreme Court by President William V.S. Tubman, and he remained on the court until his retirement in late March 1966.

In private life, Harris was married three times and fathered twelve children (four sons and eight daughters); he was a member of multiple fraternal organizations and of the Episcopal Church.  After his death, he was honored with funeral services at the Capitol Building and the Temple of Justice before his burial in his native Buchanan.

References

1895 births
1966 deaths
Cuttington University alumni
Justices of the peace
Liberian Episcopalians
People from Buchanan, Liberia
Supreme Court of Liberia justices
Place of death missing
19th-century Liberian judges